Tabisar is a town and union council of Mianwali District, Punjab, Pakistan. It is part of Isakhel Tehsil and is located at 33 08'50.97"N 71°33 40.69"E and has an altitude of 686 m (2250 ft).

References

Union councils of Mianwali District
Populated places in Mianwali District